The DigiTech JamMan is a discontinued  looper pedal formerly manufactured by DigiTech.  It is unrelated to the earlier Lexicon JamMan unit. It can record up to 99 loops, perform real-time recording, and can hold up to 6½ hours of audio.  It takes input from guitars and microphones.  It has two foot switches, one for recording/overdub and one for stopping the loop.  It also has preset rhythm tracks.

References

External links
Digitech JamMan product page
JamMan review
Set the JamMan to a specific tempo in a live situation
Advanced techniques for creating preloaded loops (link dead as of 7 April 2017)

Effects units
Sound production technology
Sampling (music)